Säve-Söderbergh may refer to:

Gunnar Säve-Söderbergh (1910-1948), Swedish paleontologist and geologist
Torgny Säve-Söderbergh (1914-1998), Swedish archaeologist and Egyptologist